Get Shakes, formed by brothers Matt and Darren Farrow, are a UK dance group from the Isle of Wight. The style is dance / electronic, comparable to that of LCD Soundsystem. The Shakes grew in popularity touring the UK in 2007/8, and publishing a number of successful remixes. "Sister Self Doubt" became a festival anthem in 2007.

The group won the Diesel:U:Music award for best electronic act.  The group also won the University of Toledo College of Law Talent Show (The Bar Show) in February 2010.

Get Shakes have an EP on iTunes but no CD available yet for offline sale. The band has announced plans to put out a single / mini-album in the near future, with the Wall of Sound label.

Their track "Disneyland (Part 1)" featured in the soundtrack for Grand Theft Auto IV, and their track "Sister Self Doubt" is part of the soundtrack of Kevin Spacey's film, 21.

References

External links

English electronic music groups
English dance music groups
Iamsound Records artists